Betlijeh (also Romanized as Betlījeh; also known as Baltagh, Belītjā, Beltīcheh, Beltījeh, and Bīltījeh) is a village in Karchambu-e Shomali Rural District, in the Central District of Buin va Miandasht County, Isfahan Province, Iran. At the 2006 census, its population was 338, in 84 families.

References 

Populated places in Buin va Miandasht County